(also 'task forces') were  (SS) paramilitary death squads of Nazi Germany that were responsible for mass murder, primarily by shooting, during World War II (1939–1945) in German-occupied Europe. The  had an integral role in the implementation of the so-called "Final Solution to the Jewish question" in territories conquered by Nazi Germany, and were involved in the murder of much of the intelligentsia and cultural elite of Poland, including members of the Catholic priesthood. Almost all of the people they murdered were civilians, beginning with the intelligentsia and swiftly progressing to Soviet political commissars, Jews, and Romani people, as well as actual or alleged partisans throughout Eastern Europe.

Under the direction of  Heinrich Himmler and the supervision of SS- Reinhard Heydrich, the  operated in territories occupied by the Wehrmacht (German armed forces) following the invasion of Poland in September 1939 and the invasion of the Soviet Union in June 1941. The  worked hand-in-hand with the Order Police battalions on the Eastern Front to carry out operations ranging from the murder of a few people to operations which lasted over two or more days, such as the massacre at Babi Yar with 33,771 Jews murdered in two days, and the Rumbula massacre (with about 25,000 Jews murdered in two days of shooting).

Fourteen death sentences and two life sentences were handed out. However, only four of these death sentences were carried out. Four additional  leaders were later tried and executed by other nations.

Formation and Aktion T4 
They also secured government buildings, questioned senior civil servants, and arrested as many as 10,000 Czech communists and German citizens.

Aktion T4 mainly took place from 1939 to 1941, but the murders continued until the end of the war.

Invasion of Poland 

Heydrich placed SS- Werner Best in command, who assigned  to choose personnel for the task forces and their subgroups, called , from among educated people with military experience and a strong ideological commitment to Nazism.

Initially numbering 2,700 men (and ultimately 4,250 in Poland), the 's mission was to murder members of the Polish leadership most clearly identified with Polish national identity: the intelligentsia, members of the clergy, teachers, and members of the nobility. As stated by Hitler: "... there must be no Polish leaders; where Polish leaders exist they must be killed, however harsh that sounds". SS- Lothar Beutel, commander of  IV, later testified that Heydrich gave the order for these murders at a series of meetings in mid-August. The lists of people to be murderedhad been drawn up by the SS as early as May 1939, using dossiers collected by the SD from 1936 forward. Members of the SS, the Wehrmacht, and the  also shot civilians during the Polish campaign. Approximately 65,000 civilians were murdered by the end of 1939. In addition to leaders of Polish society, they murdered Jews, prostitutes, Romani people, and the mentally ill. Psychiatric patients in Poland were initially murdered by shooting, but by spring 1941 gas vans were widely used.

Seven  of battalion strength (around 500 men) operated in Poland. Each was subdivided into five  of company strength (around 100 men).
  I, commanded by SS- Bruno Streckenbach, acted with 14th Army
  II, SS- Emanuel Schäfer, acted with 10th Army
  III, SS- Herbert Fischer, acted with 8th Army
  IV, SS- Lothar Beutel, acted with 4th Army
  V, SS- Ernst Damzog, acted with 3rd Army
  VI, SS- Erich Naumann, acted in Wielkopolska
  VII, SS- Udo von Woyrsch and SS- Otto Rasch, acted in Upper Silesia and Cieszyn Silesia

Though they were formally under the command of the army, the  received their orders from Heydrich and for the most part acted independently of the army. Many senior army officers were only too glad to leave these genocidal actions to the task forces, as the murders violated the rules of warfare as set down in the Geneva Conventions. However, Hitler had decreed that the army would have to tolerate and even offer logistical support to the  when it was tactically possible to do so. For example, when  Johannes Blaskowitz sent a memorandum of complaint to Hitler about the atrocities, Hitler dismissed his concerns as "childish", and Blaskowitz was relieved of his post in May 1940. He continued to serve in the army but never received promotion to field marshal.

The intention was to eventually remove all the Jews from Poland, but at this point their final destination had not yet been determined. Together, the Wehrmacht and the  also drove tens of thousands of Jews eastward into Soviet-controlled territory.

Preparations for Operation Barbarossa 

On 13 March 1941, in the lead-up to Operation Barbarossa, the planned invasion of the Soviet Union, Hitler dictated his "Guidelines in Special Spheres re: Directive No. 21 (Operation Barbarossa)". Sub-paragraph B specified that  Heinrich Himmler would be given "special tasks" on direct orders from the Führer, which he would carry out independently. This directive was intended to prevent friction between the Wehrmacht and the SS in the upcoming offensive. Hitler also specified that criminal acts against civilians perpetrated by members of the Wehrmacht during the upcoming campaign would not be prosecuted in the military courts, and thus would go unpunished.

In a speech to his leading generals on 30 March 1941, Hitler described his envisioned war against the Soviet Union. General Franz Halder, the Army's Chief of Staff, described the speech:

Though General Halder did not record any mention of Jews, German historian Andreas Hillgruber argued that because of Hitler's frequent contemporary statements about the coming war of annihilation against "Judeo-Bolshevism", his generals would have understood Hitler's call for the destruction of the Soviet Union as also comprising a call for the destruction of its Jewish population. The genocide was often described using euphemisms such as "special tasks" and "executive measures";  victims were often described as having been shot while trying to escape. In May 1941, Heydrich verbally passed on the order to murder the Soviet Jews to the SiPo NCO School in Pretzsch, where the commanders of the reorganised  were being trained for Operation Barbarossa.

In further meetings held in June 1941 Himmler outlined to top SS leaders the regime's intention to reduce the population of the Soviet Union by 30 million people, not only through direct murder of those considered racially inferior, but by depriving the remainder of food and other necessities of life.

Organisation starting in 1941 

For Operation Barbarossa, initially four  were created, each numbering 500–990 men to comprise a total force of 3,000. A, B, and C were to be attached to Army Groups North, Centre, and South;  D was assigned to the 11th Army. The  for Special Purposes operated in eastern Poland starting in July 1941. The  were under the control of the RSHA, headed by Heydrich and later by his successor, SS- Ernst Kaltenbrunner. Heydrich gave them a mandate to secure the offices and papers of the Soviet state and Communist Party; to liquidate all the higher cadres of the Soviet state; and to instigate and encourage pogroms against Jewish populations. Each  was under the operational control of the Higher SS Police Chiefs in its area of operations.

Heydrich acted under orders from  Himmler, who supplied security forces on an "as needed" basis to the local SS and Police Leaders. Led by SD, Gestapo, and Kripo officers,  included recruits from the Orpo, Security Service and Waffen-SS, augmented by uniformed volunteers from the local auxiliary police force. Each  was supplemented with Waffen-SS and Order Police battalions as well as support personnel such as drivers and radio operators. On average, the Order Police formations were larger and better armed, with heavy machine-gun detachments, which enabled them to carry out operations beyond the capability of the SS. Each death squad followed an assigned army group as they advanced into the Soviet Union. During the course of their operations, the  commanders received assistance from the Wehrmacht. The SS brigades, wrote historian Christopher Browning, were "only the thin cutting edge of German units that became involved in political and racial mass murder."

Many  leaders were highly educated; for example, nine of seventeen leaders of  A held doctorate degrees. Three  were commanded by holders of doctorates, one of whom SS- Otto Rasch) held a double doctorate.

Additional  were created as additional territories were occupied. E operated in Independent State of Croatia under three commanders, SS- , SS- Günther Herrmann, and lastly SS- Wilhelm Fuchs. The unit was subdivided into five  located in Vinkovci, Sarajevo, Banja Luka, Knin, and Zagreb. F worked with Army Group South. G operated in Romania, Hungary, and Ukraine, commanded by SS- . H was assigned to Slovakia. K and L, under SS- Emanuel Schäfer and SS- Ludwig Hahn, worked alongside 5th and 6th Panzer Armies during the Ardennes offensive.

Killings in the Soviet Union 

After the invasion of the Soviet Union on 22 June 1941, the 's main assignment was to kill civilians, as in Poland, but this time its targets specifically included Soviet Communist Party commissars and Jews. Open-ended instructions were given to execute "other radical elements (saboteurs, propagandists, snipers, assassins, agitators, etc.)." He instructed that any pogroms spontaneously initiated by the population of the occupied territories were to be quietly encouraged.

On 8 July, Heydrich announced that all Jews were to be regarded as partisans, and gave the order for all male Jews between the ages of 15 and 45 to be shot. Unlike in Germany, where the Nuremberg Laws of 1935 defined as Jewish anyone with at least three Jewish grandparents, the  defined as Jewish anyone with at least one Jewish grandparent; in either case, whether or not the person practised the religion was irrelevant. The unit was also assigned to exterminate Romani people and the mentally ill.

As the invasion began, the Germans pursued the fleeing Red Army, leaving a security vacuum. Reports surfaced of Soviet guerrilla activity in the area, with local Jews immediately suspected of collaboration. Heydrich ordered his officers to incite anti-Jewish pogroms in the newly occupied territories. Within the first few weeks of Operation Barbarossa, 10,000 Jews had been murdered in 40 pogroms, and by the end of 1941 some 60 pogroms had taken place, claiming as many as 24,000 victims. However,  Franz Walter Stahlecker, commander of  A, reported to his superiors in mid-October that the residents of Kaunas were not spontaneously starting pogroms, and secret assistance by the Germans was required. A similar reticence was noted by  B in Russia and Belarus and  C in Ukraine; the further east the  travelled, the less likely the residents were to be prompted into murdering their Jewish neighbours.

All four main  took part in mass shootings from the early days of the war. Initially the targets were adult Jewish men, but by August the net had been widened to include women, children, and the elderly—the entire Jewish population. Initially there was a semblance of legality given to the shootings, with trumped-up charges being read out (arson, sabotage, black marketeering, or refusal to work, for example) and victims being murdered by a firing squad. As this method proved too slow, the  began to take their victims out in larger groups and shot them next to, or even inside, mass graves that had been prepared. Some  started to use automatic weapons, with survivors being murdered with a pistol shot.

As word of the massacres got out, many Jews fled; in Ukraine, 70 to 90 per cent of the Jews ran away. This was seen by the leader of  VI as beneficial, as it would save the regime the costs of deporting the victims further east over the Urals. In other areas the invasion was so successful that the  had insufficient forces to immediately murder all the Jews in the conquered territories. A situation report from  C in September 1941 noted that not all Jews were members of the Bolshevist apparatus, and suggested that the total elimination of Jewry would have a negative impact on the economy and the food supply. The Nazis began to round their victims up into concentration camps and ghettos and rural districts were for the most part rendered  (free of Jews). Jewish councils were set up in major cities and forced labour gangs were established to make use of the Jews as slave labour until they were totally eliminated, a goal that was postponed until 1942.

The  used public hangings as a terror tactic against the local population. An  B report, dated 9 October 1941, described one such hanging. Due to suspected partisan activity near Demidov, all male residents aged 15 to 55 were put in a camp to be screened. The screening produced seventeen people who were identified as "partisans" and "Communists". Five members of the group were hanged while 400 local residents were assembled to watch; the rest were shot.

Babi Yar 

The largest mass shooting perpetrated by the  took place on 29 and 30 September 1941 at Babi Yar, a ravine northwest of Kyiv city center in Ukraine that had fallen to the Germans on 19 September. The perpetrators included a company of Waffen-SS attached to  C under Rasch, members of  4a under SS- Friedrich Jeckeln, and some Ukrainian auxiliary police. The Jews of Kyiv were told to report to a certain street corner on 29 September; anyone who disobeyed would be shot. Since word of massacres in other areas had not yet reached Kyiv and the assembly point was near the train station, they assumed they were being deported. People showed up at the rendezvous point in large numbers, laden with possessions and food for the journey.

Thirty or forty people at a time were told to leave their possessions and were escorted through a narrow passageway lined with soldiers brandishing clubs. Anyone who tried to escape was beaten. Soon the victims reached an open area, where they were forced to strip, and then were herded down into the ravine. People were forced to lie down in rows on top of the bodies of other victims, and they were shot in the back of the head or the neck by members of the execution squads.

The murders continued for two days, claiming a total of 33,771 victims. Sand was shovelled and bulldozed over the bodies and the sides of the ravine were dynamited to bring down more material. Anton Heidborn, a member of  4a, later testified that three days later that there were still people alive among the corpses. Heidborn spent the next few days helping smooth out the "millions" of banknotes taken from the victims' possessions. The clothing was taken away, destined to be re-used by German citizens. Jeckeln's troops shot more than 100,000 Jews by the end of October.

Killings in Lithuania, Latvia, and Estonia 

 A operated in Baltic states of Lithuania, Latvia, and Estonia (the three Baltic countries which had been occupied by the Soviet Union in 1940–1941). According to its own reports to Himmler,  A murdered almost 140,000 people in the five months following the 1941 German invasion: 136,421 Jews, 1,064 Communists, 653 people with mental illnesses, 56 partisans, 44 Poles, five Romani, and one Armenian were reported murdered between 22 June and 25 November 1941.

Upon entering Kaunas, Lithuania, on 25 June 1941, the  released the criminals from the local jail and encouraged them to join the pogrom which was underway. Between 23 and 27 June 1941, 4,000 Jews were murdered on the streets of Kaunas and in nearby open pits and ditches. Particularly active in the Kaunas pogrom was the so-called "Death Dealer of Kaunas", a young man who murdered Jews with a crowbar at the Lietukis Garage before a large crowd that cheered each murder with much applause; he occasionally paused to play the Lithuanian national anthem "Tautiška giesmė" on his accordion before resuming the murders.

As  A advanced into Lithuania, it actively recruited local nationalists and antisemitic groups. In July 1941, local Lithuanian collaborators, pejoratively called "White Armbands", joined the massacres. A pogrom in the Latvian capital Riga in early July 1941 killed 400 Jews. Latvian nationalist Viktors Arājs and his supporters undertook a campaign of arson against synagogues. Together,  A and the  murdered 2,300 Jews in Riga on 6–7 July. Within six months, Arājs and collaborators would murder about half of Latvia's Jewish population.

Similar units were created elsewhere, and provided much of the manpower for the Holocaust in Eastern Europe.

With extensive local help,  A was the first  to attempt to systematically exterminate all the Jews in its area. Latvian historian Modris Eksteins wrote:

In late 1941, the  settled into headquarters in Kaunas, Riga, and Tallinn.  A grew less mobile and faced problems because of its small size. The Germans relied increasingly on the Latvian  and similar groups to perform massacres of Jews.

Such extensive and enthusiastic collaboration with the  has been attributed to several factors. The 1940–1941 Soviet occupation had been profoundly traumatic for residents of the Baltic states and areas that had been part of Poland until 1939; the population was brutalised and terrorised, and the existing familiar structures of society were destroyed.

Historian Erich Haberer has suggested that many survived and made sense of the "totalitarian atomization" of society by seeking conformity with communism. As a result, by the time of the German invasion in 1941, many had come to see conformity with a totalitarian regime as socially acceptable behaviour; thus, people simply transferred their allegiance to the German regime when it arrived. Some who had collaborated with the Soviet regime sought to divert attention from themselves by naming Jews as collaborators and murdering them.

Rumbula 

In November 1941 Himmler was dissatisfied with the pace of the exterminations in Latvia, as he intended to move Jews from Germany into the area. He assigned SS- Jeckeln, one of the perpetrators of the Babi Yar massacre, to liquidate the Riga ghetto. These troops were supplemented by Latvians, including members of the Riga city police, battalion police, and ghetto guards. Around 1,500 able-bodied Jews would be spared execution so their slave labour could be exploited; a thousand men were relocated to a fenced-off area within the ghetto and 500 women were temporarily housed in a prison and later moved to a separate nearby ghetto, where they were put to work mending uniforms.

Although Rumbula was on the rail line, Jeckeln decided that the victims should travel on foot from Riga to the execution ground. Trucks and buses were arranged to carry children and the elderly. The first day of executions, 30 November 1941, began with the perpetrators rousing and assembling the victims at 4:00 am. The victims were moved in columns of a thousand people toward the execution ground. As they walked, some SS men went up and down the line, shooting people who could not keep up the pace or who tried to run away or rest.

Here the victims were split into groups of fifty and taken deeper into the forest, near the pits, where they were ordered to strip. The victims were driven into the prepared trenches, made to lie down, and shot in the head or the back of the neck by members of Jeckeln's bodyguard. Around 13,000 Jews from Riga were murdered at the pits that day, along with a thousand Jews from Berlin who had just arrived by train. On the second day of the operation, 8 December 1941, the remaining 10,000 Jews of Riga were murdered in the same way. About a thousand were murdered on the streets of the city or on the way to the site, bringing the total number of deaths for the two-day extermination to 25,000 people. For his part in organising the massacre, Jeckeln was promoted to Leader of the SS Upper Section, Ostland.

Second sweep 

 B, C, and D did not immediately follow  A's example in systematically murdering all Jews in their areas. The  commanders, with the exception of  A's Stahlecker, were of the opinion by the fall of 1941 that it was impossible to murder the entire Jewish population of the Soviet Union in one sweep, and thought the murders should stop. An  report dated 17 September advised that the Germans would be better off using any skilled Jews as labourers rather than shooting them. Also, in some areas poor weather and a lack of transportation led to a slowdown in deportations of Jews from points further west. Thus, an interval passed between the first round of  massacres in summer and fall, and what American historian Raul Hilberg called the second sweep, which started in December 1941 and lasted into the summer of 1942. During the interval, the surviving Jews were forced into ghettos.

 A had already murdered almost all Jews in its area, so it shifted its operations into Belarus to assist  B. In Dnepropetrovsk in February 1942,  D reduced the city's Jewish population from 30,000 to 702 over the course of four days. The German Order Police and local collaborators provided the extra manpower needed to perform all the shootings. Haberer wrote that, as in the Baltic states, the Germans could not have murdered so many Jews so quickly without local help. He points out that the ratio of Order Police to auxiliaries was 1 to 10 in both Ukraine and Belarus. In rural areas the proportion was 1 to 20. This meant that most Ukrainian and Belarusian Jews were murdered by fellow Ukrainians and Belarusians commanded by German officers rather than by Germans.

The second wave of exterminations in the Soviet Union met with armed resistance in some areas, though the chance of success was poor. Weapons were typically primitive or home-made. Communications were impossible between ghettos in various cities, so there was no way to create a unified strategy. Few in the ghetto leadership supported resistance for fear of reprisals on the ghetto residents. Mass break-outs were sometimes attempted, though survival in the forest was nearly impossible due to the lack of food and the fact that escapees were often tracked down and murdered.

Transition to gassing 

Many of the troops found the massacres to be difficult if not impossible to perform. Some of the perpetrators suffered physical and mental health problems, and many turned to drink. As much as possible, the  leaders militarized the genocide. The historian Christian Ingrao notes an attempt was made to make the shootings a collective act without individual responsibility. Framing the shootings in this way was not psychologically sufficient for every perpetrator to feel absolved of guilt. Browning notes three categories of potential perpetrators: those who were eager to participate right from the start, those who participated in spite of moral qualms because they were ordered to do so, and a significant minority who refused to take part. A few men spontaneously became excessively brutal in their killing methods and their zeal for the task. Commander of  D, SS- Otto Ohlendorf, particularly noted this propensity towards excess, and ordered that any man who was too eager to participate or too brutal should not perform any further executions.

During a visit to Minsk in August 1941, Himmler witnessed an  mass execution first-hand and concluded that shooting Jews was too stressful for his men. By November he made arrangements for any SS men suffering ill health from having participated in executions to be provided with rest and mental health care. He also decided a transition should be made to gassing the victims, especially the women and children, and ordered the recruitment of expendable native auxiliaries who could assist with the murders. Gas vans, which had been used previously to murder mental patients, began to see service by all four main  from 1942. Prisoners or auxiliaries were often assigned to do this task so as to spare the SS men the trauma. Some of the early mass murders at extermination camps used carbon monoxide fumes produced by diesel engines, similar to the method used in gas vans, but by as early as September 1941 experiments were begun at Auschwitz using Zyklon B, a cyanide-based pesticide gas.

Plans for the total eradication of the Jewish population of Europe—eleven million people—were formalised at the Wannsee Conference, held on 20 January 1942. Some would be worked to death, and the rest would be murdered in the implementation of the Final Solution of the Jewish question. Permanent killing centres at Auschwitz, Belzec, Chelmno, Majdanek, Sobibor, Treblinka, and other Nazi extermination camps replaced mobile death squads as the primary method of mass-murder. The  remained active, however, and were put to work fighting partisans, particularly in Belarus.

After the fall of Stalingrad in February 1943, Himmler realised that Germany would likely lose the war, and ordered the formation of a special task force, Sonderaktion 1005, under SS- Paul Blobel. The unit's assignment was to visit mass graves all along the Eastern Front to exhume bodies and burn them in an attempt to cover up the genocide. The task remained unfinished at the end of the war, and many mass graves remain unmarked and unexcavated.

By 1944 the Red Army had begun to push the German forces out of Eastern Europe, and the  retreated alongside the Wehrmacht. By late 1944, most  personnel had been folded into Waffen-SS combat units or transferred to permanent death camps. The total number of Jews murdered during the war is estimated at 5.5 to six million people.

Plans for the Middle East and Britain 
The unit was to enter Egypt and Mandatory Palestine once German forces arrived there. According to Mallmann and Cüppers, the unit's purpose was to carry out mass-murder of the Jewish populations in those areas. Former Iraqi prime minister Rashid Ali al-Gaylani and the Grand Mufti of Jerusalem Haj Amin al-Husseini played roles, engaging in antisemitic radio propaganda, preparing to recruit volunteers, and in raising an Arab-German Battalion that would also follow  Egypt to the Middle East. Since Rommel was 500 km away at the First Battle of El Alamein, it is unlikely that the two met. According to historian Haim Saadon, Director of the Center of Research on North African Jewry in World War II, Rauff's documents show that his foremost concern was assisting the Wehrmacht, and his plan for this was to place the Jews in forced labour camps. In relative terms, the North African Jews largely escaped the Final Solution. The plans for  Egypt were set aside after the Allied victory at the Second Battle of El Alamein.

Had Operation Sea Lion, the German plan for an invasion of the United Kingdom been launched, six  were scheduled to follow the invasion force into Britain. The list included Churchill, members of the cabinet, prominent journalists and authors, and members of the Czechoslovak government-in-exile.

Jäger Report 

The  kept official records of many of their massacres and provided detailed reports to their superiors. The Jäger Report, filed by Commander SS- Karl Jäger on 1 December 1941 to his superior, Stahlecker (head of  A), covers the activities of  III in Lithuania over the five-month period from 2 July 1941 to 25 November 1941.

Jäger's report provides an almost daily running total of the liquidations of 137,346 people, the vast majority of them Jews. The report documents the exact date and place of massacres, the number of victims, and their breakdown into categories (Jews, Communists, criminals, and so on). Women were shot from the very beginning, but initially in fewer numbers than men. Children were first included in the tally starting in mid-August, when 3,207 people were murdered in Rokiškis on 15–16 August 1941. For the most part the report does not give any military justification for the murders; people were murdered solely because they were Jews. In total, the report lists over 100 executions in 71 different locations. Jäger wrote: "I can state today that the goal of solving the Jewish problem in Lithuania has been reached by  3. There are no more Jews in Lithuania, apart from working Jews and their families." In a February 1942 addendum to the report, Jäger increased the total number of victims to 138,272, giving a breakdown of 48,252 men, 55,556 women, and 34,464 children. Only 1,851 of the victims were non-Jewish.

Jäger escaped capture by the Allies when the war ended. He lived in Heidelberg under his own name until his report was discovered in March 1959. Arrested and charged, Jäger committed suicide on 22 June 1959 in a Hohenasperg prison while awaiting trial for his crimes.

Involvement of the Wehrmacht

The murders took place with the knowledge and support of the German Army in the east. On 10 October 1941 Field Marshal Walther von Reichenau drafted an order to be read to the German Sixth Army on the Eastern Front. Now known as the Severity Order, it read in part:

Field Marshal Gerd von Rundstedt of Army Group South expressed his "complete agreement" with the order. He sent out a circular to the generals under his command urging them to release their own versions and to impress upon their troops the need to exterminate the Jews. General Erich von Manstein, in an order to his troops on 20 November, stated that "the Jewish-Bolshevist system must be exterminated once and for all." Manstein sent a letter to  D commanding officer Ohlendorf complaining that it was unfair that the SS was keeping all of the murdered Jews' wristwatches for themselves instead of sharing with the Army.

Beyond this trivial complaint, the Army and the  worked closely and effectively. On 6 July 1941  4b of  C reported that "Armed forces surprisingly welcome hostility against the Jews". Few complaints about the murders were ever raised by Wehrmacht officers. On 8 September,  D reported that relations with the German Army were "excellent". In the same month, Stahlecker of  A wrote that Army Group North had been exemplary in co-operating with the exterminations and that relations with the 4th Panzer Army, commanded by General Erich Hoepner, were "very close, almost cordial". In the south, the Romanian Army worked closely with  D to massacre Ukrainian Jews, murdering around 26,000 Jews in the Odessa massacre. The German historian Peter Longerich thinks it probable that the Wehrmacht, along with the Organization of Ukrainian Nationalists (OUN), incited the Lviv pogroms, during which 8,500 to 9,000 Jews were murdered by the native population and  C in July 1941.

The Wehrmacht tried to justify their considerable involvement in the  massacres as being anti-partisan operations rather than racist attacks, but Hillgruber wrote that this was just an excuse.

Einsatzgruppen trial 

The men were charged with crimes against humanity, war crimes, and membership in the SS (which had been declared a criminal organization). Fourteen death sentences and two life sentences were among the judgments; only four executions were carried out, on 7 June 1951; the rest were reduced to lesser sentences. Four additional  leaders were later tried and executed by other nations.

Several  leaders, including Ohlendorf, claimed at the trial to have received an order before Operation Barbarossa requiring them to murder all Soviet Jews. To date no evidence has been found that such an order was ever issued. German prosecutor Alfred Streim noted that if such an order had been given, post-war courts would only have been able to convict the  leaders as accomplices to mass murder. However, if it could be established that the  had committed mass murder without orders, then they could have been convicted as perpetrators of mass murder, and hence could have received stiffer sentences, including capital punishment.

Streim postulated that the existence of an early comprehensive order was a fabrication created for use in Ohlendorf's defence. This theory is now widely accepted by historians. Longerich notes that most orders received by the  leaders—especially when they were being ordered to carry out criminal activities—were vague, and couched in terminology that had a specific meaning for members of the regime. Leaders were given briefings about the need to be "severe" and "firm"; all Jews were to be viewed as potential enemies that had to be dealt with ruthlessly. British historian Sir Ian Kershaw argues that Hitler's apocalyptic remarks before Barbarossa about the necessity for a war without mercy to "annihilate" the forces of "Judeo-Bolshevism" were interpreted by  commanders as permission and encouragement to engage in extreme antisemitic violence, with each  commander to use his own discretion about how far he was prepared to go.

Most of the perpetrators of Nazi war crimes were never charged, and returned unremarked to civilian life. The West German Central Prosecution Office of Nazi War Criminals only charged about a hundred former  members with war crimes. And as time went on, it became more difficult to obtain prosecutions; witnesses grew older and were less likely to be able to offer valuable testimony. Funding for trials was inadequate, and the governments of Austria and Germany became less interested in obtaining convictions for wartime events, preferring to forget the Nazi past.

See also 
 Functionalism versus intentionalism
 Glossary of Nazi Germany
 List of Nazi Party leaders and officials
 Myth of the clean Wehrmacht
 Porajmos

References

Explanatory notes

Citations

Sources

Further reading

External links 

 United States Holocaust Memorial Museum article on 
 "Einsatzgruppen"  The Holocaust Education & Archive Research Team

 
Military units and formations of Germany in World War II
The Holocaust in Ukraine
The Holocaust in Latvia
The Holocaust in Lithuania
The Holocaust in Estonia
The Holocaust in Russia
The Holocaust in Belarus
The Holocaust in Poland
Holocaust terminology
Gestapo
Reinhard Heydrich
Reich Security Main Office
Police of Nazi Germany